Elysius terraoides is a moth of the family Erebidae. It was described by Walter Rothschild in 1909. It is found in Peru and Bolivia.

References

terraoides
Moths described in 1909
Moths of South America